Xəlfəkücə (also, Xəlifəkücə, Xəlfəküçə, and Khalfakyudzha) is a village in the Lerik Rayon of Azerbaijan.  The village forms part of the municipality of Ambu.

References 

Populated places in Lerik District